Surendra Vithal Nayak  (born 20 October 1954) is a former Indian cricketer who played in two Test matches and four One Day Internationals in 1981 and 1982.

1954 births
Living people
India Test cricketers
India One Day International cricketers
Indian cricketers
Mumbai cricketers
West Zone cricketers
Cricketers from Mumbai